Sülümenli is a town (belde) and municipality in the Afyonkarahisar District, Afyonkarahisar Province, Turkey. Its population is 3,877 (2021). It is located 20 km away from the city of Afyonkarahisar. It is bordered by Gebeceler to the north, Çavdarlı to the northwest, Çukurköy to the west, the village of Karaaslan to the southwest, Işıklar to the south and Çobanlar to the east. It has a surface area of 208 km². It has the largest sugar factory of Turkey in its border and irrigation channels for agricultural activities.

History

According to myths, Sülümenli is founded by a group of Süleymanlı (Salmanlı) branch of Avşar Tribe of Danishment principality.

Social life

The town has three primary schools, six mosques, two quran schools, and a health office.

Administration

The town became municipality at 1967 and İsmail ÇAKAL is mayor second time.

The town has 6 quarters:

Economy

Afyonkarahisar Sugar Factory and Sugar Machine Factory and many brick and tile factories are located within the borders.

Population

References

Towns in Turkey
Populated places in Afyonkarahisar District